Irwin Allen Ginsberg (June 3, 1926 – April 5, 1997) was an American poet and writer. As a student at Columbia University in the 1940s, he began friendships with William S. Burroughs and Jack Kerouac, forming the core of the Beat Generation. He vigorously opposed militarism, economic materialism, and sexual repression, and he embodied various aspects of this counterculture with his views on drugs, sex, multiculturalism, hostility to bureaucracy, and openness to Eastern religions.

Best known for his poem "Howl", Ginsberg denounced what he saw as the destructive forces of capitalism and conformity in the United States. San Francisco police and US Customs seized copies of "Howl" in 1956, and a subsequent obscenity trial in 1957 attracted widespread publicity due to the poem's language and descriptions of heterosexual and homosexual sex at a time when sodomy laws made (male) homosexual acts a crime in every state. The poem reflected Ginsberg's own sexuality and his relationships with a number of men, including Peter Orlovsky, his lifelong partner. Judge Clayton W. Horn ruled that "Howl" was not obscene, asking: "Would there be any freedom of press or speech if one must reduce his vocabulary to vapid innocuous euphemisms?"

Ginsberg was a Buddhist who extensively studied Eastern religious disciplines. He lived modestly, buying his clothing in second-hand stores and residing in apartments in New York City's East Village. One of his most influential teachers was Tibetan Buddhist Chögyam Trungpa, the founder of the Naropa Institute in Boulder, Colorado. At Trungpa's urging, Ginsberg and poet Anne Waldman started The Jack Kerouac School of Disembodied Poetics there in 1974.

For decades, Ginsberg was active in political protests across a range of issues from the Vietnam War to the war on drugs. His poem "September on Jessore Road" drew attention to refugees fleeing the 1971 Bangladeshi genocide, exemplifying what literary critic Helen Vendler described as Ginsberg's persistent opposition to "imperial politics" and the "persecution of the powerless". His collection The Fall of America shared the annual National Book Award for Poetry in 1974. In 1979, he received the National Arts Club gold medal and was inducted into the American Academy of Arts and Letters. He was a Pulitzer Prize finalist in 1995 for his book Cosmopolitan Greetings: Poems 1986–1992.

Biography

Early life and family
Ginsberg was born into a Jewish family in Newark, New Jersey, and grew up in nearby Paterson. He was the second son of Louis Ginsberg, also born in Newark, a schoolteacher and sometime poet, and the former Naomi Levy, born in Nevel (Russia) and a fervent Marxist.

As a teenager, Ginsberg began to write letters to The New York Times about political issues, such as World War II and workers' rights. He published his first poems in the Paterson Morning Call. While in high school, Ginsberg became interested in the works of Walt Whitman, inspired by his teacher's passionate reading. In 1943, Ginsberg graduated from Eastside High School and briefly attended Montclair State College before entering Columbia University on a scholarship from the Young Men's Hebrew Association of Paterson.

In 1945, he joined the Merchant Marine to earn money to continue his education at Columbia. While at Columbia, Ginsberg contributed to the Columbia Review literary journal, the Jester humor magazine, won the Woodberry Poetry Prize, served as president of the Philolexian Society (literary and debate group), and joined Boar's Head Society (poetry society).
He was a resident of Hartley Hall, where other Beat Generation poets such as Jack Kerouac and Herbert Gold also lived. Ginsberg has stated that he considered his required freshman seminar in Great Books, taught by Lionel Trilling, to be his favorite Columbia course.

According to The Poetry Foundation, Ginsberg spent several months in a mental institution after he pleaded insanity during a hearing. He was allegedly being prosecuted for harboring stolen goods in his dorm room. It was noted that the stolen property was not his, but belonged to an acquaintance. Ginsberg also took part in public readings at the Episcopal St. Mark's Church in-the-Bowery which would later hold a memorial service for him after his death.

Relationship with his parents
Ginsberg referred to his parents in a 1985 interview as "old-fashioned delicatessen philosophers". His mother was also an active member of the Communist Party and took Ginsberg and his brother Eugene to party meetings. Ginsberg later said that his mother "made up bedtime stories that all went something like: 'The good king rode forth from his castle, saw the suffering workers and healed them.'" Of his father Ginsberg said: "My father would go around the house either reciting Emily Dickinson and Longfellow under his breath or attacking T. S. Eliot for ruining poetry with his 'obscurantism.' I grew suspicious of both sides."

Naomi Ginsberg had schizophrenia which often manifested as paranoid delusions, disordered thinking and multiple suicide tentatives. She would claim, for example, that the president had implanted listening devices in their home and that her mother-in-law was trying to kill her. Her suspicion of those around her caused Naomi to draw closer to young Allen, "her little pet," as Bill Morgan says in his biography of Ginsberg, titled I Celebrate Myself: The Somewhat Private Life of Allen Ginsberg. She also tried to kill herself by slitting her wrists and was soon taken to Greystone, a mental hospital; she would spend much of Ginsberg's youth in mental hospitals. His experiences with his mother and her mental illness were a major inspiration for his two major works, "Howl" and his long autobiographical poem "Kaddish for Naomi Ginsberg (1894–1956)".

When he was in junior high school, he accompanied his mother by bus to her therapist. The trip deeply disturbed Ginsberg—he mentioned it and other moments from his childhood in "Kaddish". His experiences with his mother's mental illness and her institutionalization are also frequently referred to in "Howl." For example, "Pilgrim State, Rockland, and Grey Stone's foetid halls" is a reference to institutions frequented by his mother and Carl Solomon, ostensibly the subject of the poem: Pilgrim State Hospital and Rockland State Hospital in New York and Greystone Park Psychiatric Hospital in New Jersey. This is followed soon by the line "with mother finally ******." Ginsberg later admitted the deletion was the expletive "fucked." He also says of Solomon in section three, "I'm with you in Rockland where you imitate the shade of my mother," once again showing the association between Solomon and his mother.

Ginsberg received a letter from his mother after her death responding to a copy of "Howl" he had sent her. It admonished Ginsberg to be good and stay away from drugs; she says, "The key is in the window, the key is in the sunlight at the window—I have the key—Get married Allen don't take drugs—the key is in the bars, in the sunlight in the window." In a letter she wrote to Ginsberg's brother Eugene, she said, "God's informers come to my bed, and God himself I saw in the sky. The sunshine showed too, a key on the side of the window for me to get out. The yellow of the sunshine, also showed the key on the side of the window." These letters and the absence of a facility to recite kaddish inspired Ginsberg to write "Kaddish", which makes references to many details from Naomi's life, Ginsberg's experiences with her, and the letter, including the lines "the key is in the light" and "the key is in the window."

New York Beats
In Ginsberg's first year at Columbia he met fellow undergraduate Lucien Carr, who introduced him to a number of future Beat writers, including Jack Kerouac, William S. Burroughs, and John Clellon Holmes. They bonded, because they saw in one another an excitement about the potential of American youth, a potential that existed outside the strict conformist confines of post–World War II, McCarthy-era America. Ginsberg and Carr talked excitedly about a "New Vision" (a phrase adapted from Yeats' "A Vision"), for literature and America. Carr also introduced Ginsberg to Neal Cassady, for whom Ginsberg had a long infatuation. In the first chapter of his 1957 novel On the Road Kerouac described the meeting between Ginsberg and Cassady. Kerouac saw them as the dark (Ginsberg) and light (Cassady) side of their "New Vision", a perception stemming partly from Ginsberg's association with communism, of which Kerouac had become increasingly distrustful. Though Ginsberg was never a member of the Communist Party, Kerouac named him "Carlo Marx" in On the Road. This was a source of strain in their relationship.

Also, in New York, Ginsberg met Gregory Corso in the Pony Stable Bar. Corso, recently released from prison, was supported by the Pony Stable patrons and was writing poetry there the night of their meeting. Ginsberg claims he was immediately attracted to Corso, who was straight, but understood of homosexuality after three years in prison. Ginsberg was even more struck by reading Corso's poems, realizing Corso was "spiritually gifted." Ginsberg introduced Corso to the rest of his inner circle. In their first meeting at the Pony Stable, Corso showed Ginsberg a poem about a woman who lived across the street from him and sunbathed naked in the window. Amazingly, the woman happened to be Ginsberg's girlfriend that he was living with during one of his forays into heterosexuality. Ginsberg took Corso over to their apartment. There the woman proposed sex with Corso, who was still very young and fled in fear. Ginsberg introduced Corso to Kerouac and Burroughs and they began to travel together. Ginsberg and Corso remained lifelong friends and collaborators.

Shortly after this period in Ginsberg's life, he became romantically involved with Elise Nada Cowen after meeting her through Alex Greer, a philosophy professor at Barnard College whom she had dated for a while during the burgeoning Beat generation's period of development. As a Barnard student, Elise Cowen extensively read the poetry of Ezra Pound and T. S. Eliot, when she met Joyce Johnson and Leo Skir, among other Beat players. As Cowen had felt a strong attraction to darker poetry most of the time, Beat poetry seemed to provide an allure to what suggests a shadowy side of her persona. While at Barnard, Cowen earned the nickname "Beat Alice" as she had joined a small group of anti-establishment artists and visionaries known to outsiders as beatniks, and one of her first acquaintances at the college was the beat poet Joyce Johnson who later portrayed Cowen in her books, including "Minor Characters" and Come and Join the Dance, which expressed the two women's experiences in the Barnard and Columbia Beat community. Through his association with Elise Cowen, Ginsberg discovered that they shared a mutual friend, Carl Solomon, to whom he later dedicated his most famous poem "Howl." This poem is considered an autobiography of Ginsberg up to 1955, and a brief history of the Beat Generation through its references to his relationship to other Beat artists of that time.

"Blake vision"
In 1948, in an apartment in Harlem, Ginsberg had an auditory hallucination while reading the poetry of William Blake (later referred to as his "Blake vision"). At first, Ginsberg claimed to have heard the voice of God but later interpreted the voice as that of Blake himself reading Ah! Sun-flower, The Sick Rose, and The Little Girl Lost, also described by Ginsberg as "voice of the ancient of days." The experience lasted several days. Ginsberg believed that he had witnessed the interconnectedness of the universe. He looked at latticework on the fire escape and realized some hand had crafted that; he then looked at the sky and intuited that some hand had crafted that also, or rather, that the sky was the hand that crafted itself. He explained that this hallucination was not inspired by drug use but said he sought to recapture that feeling later with various drugs. Ginsberg stated: "[...] not that some hand had placed the sky but that the sky was the living blue hand itself. Or that God was in front of my eyes—existence itself was God," and "[...] it was a sudden awakening into a totally deeper real universe than I'd been existing in."

San Francisco Renaissance
Ginsberg moved to San Francisco during the 1950s. Before Howl and Other Poems was published in 1956 by City Lights, he worked as a market researcher.

In 1954, in San Francisco, Ginsberg met Peter Orlovsky (1933–2010), with whom he fell in love and who remained his lifelong partner. Selections from their correspondence have been published.

Also in San Francisco, Ginsberg met members of the San Francisco Renaissance (James Broughton, Robert Duncan, Madeline Gleason and Kenneth Rexroth) and other poets who would later be associated with the Beat Generation in a broader sense. Ginsberg's mentor William Carlos Williams wrote an introductory letter to San Francisco Renaissance figurehead Kenneth Rexroth, who then introduced Ginsberg into the San Francisco poetry scene. There, Ginsberg also met three budding poets and Zen enthusiasts who had become friends at Reed College: Gary Snyder, Philip Whalen, and Lew Welch. In 1959, along with poets John Kelly, Bob Kaufman, A. D. Winans, and William Margolis, Ginsberg was one of the founders of the Beatitude poetry magazine.

Wally Hedrick—a painter and co-founder of the Six Gallery—approached Ginsberg in mid-1955 and asked him to organize a poetry reading at the Six Gallery. At first, Ginsberg refused, but once he had written a rough draft of "Howl," he changed his "fucking mind," as he put it. Ginsberg advertised the event as "Six Poets at the Six Gallery." One of the most important events in Beat mythos, known simply as "The Six Gallery reading" took place on October 7, 1955. The event, in essence, brought together the East and West Coast factions of the Beat Generation. Of more personal significance to Ginsberg, the reading that night included the first public presentation of "Howl," a poem that brought worldwide fame to Ginsberg and to many of the poets associated with him. An account of that night can be found in Kerouac's novel The Dharma Bums, describing how change was collected from audience members to buy jugs of wine, and Ginsberg reading passionately, drunken, with arms outstretched.

Ginsberg's principal work, "Howl," is well known for its opening line: "I saw the best minds of my generation destroyed by madness, starving hysterical naked [...]." "Howl" was considered scandalous at the time of its publication, because of the rawness of its language. Shortly after its 1956 publication by San Francisco's City Lights Bookstore, it was banned for obscenity. The ban became a cause célèbre among defenders of the First Amendment, and was later lifted, after Judge Clayton W. Horn declared the poem to possess redeeming artistic value. Ginsberg and Shig Murao, the City Lights manager who was jailed for selling "Howl," became lifelong friends.

Biographical references in "Howl"
Ginsberg claimed at one point that all of his work was an extended biography (like Kerouac's Duluoz Legend). "Howl" is not only a biography of Ginsberg's experiences before 1955, but also a history of the Beat Generation. Ginsberg also later claimed that at the core of "Howl" were his unresolved emotions about his schizophrenic mother. Though "Kaddish" deals more explicitly with his mother, "Howl" in many ways is driven by the same emotions. "Howl" chronicles the development of many important friendships throughout Ginsberg's life. He begins the poem with "I saw the best minds of my generation destroyed by madness", which sets the stage for Ginsberg to describe Cassady and Solomon, immortalizing them into American literature. This madness was the "angry fix" that society needed to function—madness was its disease. In the poem, Ginsberg focused on "Carl Solomon! I'm with you in Rockland", and, thus, turned Solomon into an archetypal figure searching for freedom from his "straightjacket". Though references in most of his poetry reveal much about his biography, his relationship to other members of the Beat Generation, and his own political views, "Howl," his most famous poem, is still perhaps the best place to start.

To Paris and the "Beat Hotel", Tangier and India
In 1957, Ginsberg surprised the literary world by abandoning San Francisco. After a spell in Morocco, he and Peter Orlovsky joined Gregory Corso in Paris. Corso introduced them to a shabby lodging house above a bar at 9 rue Gît-le-Cœur that was to become known as the Beat Hotel. They were soon joined by Burroughs and others. It was a productive, creative time for all of them. There, Ginsberg began his epic poem "Kaddish," Corso composed Bomb and Marriage, and Burroughs (with help from Ginsberg and Corso) put together Naked Lunch from previous writings. This period was documented by the photographer Harold Chapman, who moved in at about the same time, and took pictures constantly of the residents of the "hotel" until it closed in 1963. During 1962–1963, Ginsberg and Orlovsky travelled extensively across India, living half a year at a time in Calcutta (now Kolkata) and Benares (Varanasi). On his road to India he stayed two months in Athens ( 29/08/1961 - 31/10/1961) where he visited various cites such as Delphi, Mycines, Crete, and then he continued his journey to Israel, Kenya and finally India. Also during this time, he formed friendships with some of the prominent young Bengali poets of the time including Shakti Chattopadhyay and Sunil Gangopadhyay. Ginsberg had several political connections in India; most notably Pupul Jayakar who helped him extend his stay in India when the authorities were eager to expel him.

England and the International Poetry Incarnation
In May 1965, Ginsberg arrived in London, and offered to read anywhere for free. Shortly after his arrival, he gave a reading at Better Books, which was described by Jeff Nuttall as "the first healing wind on a very parched collective mind." Tom McGrath wrote: "This could well turn out to have been a very significant moment in the history of England—or at least in the history of English Poetry."

Soon after the bookshop reading, plans were hatched for the International Poetry Incarnation, which was held at the Royal Albert Hall in London on June 11, 1965. The event attracted an audience of 7,000, who heard readings and live and tape performances by a wide variety of figures, including Ginsberg, Adrian Mitchell, Alexander Trocchi, Harry Fainlight, Anselm Hollo, Christopher Logue, George MacBeth, Gregory Corso, Lawrence Ferlinghetti, Michael Horovitz, Simon Vinkenoog, Spike Hawkins and Tom McGrath. The event was organized by Ginsberg's friend, the filmmaker Barbara Rubin.

Peter Whitehead documented the event on film and released it as Wholly Communion. A book featuring images from the film and some of the poems that were performed was also published under the same title by Lorrimer in the UK and Grove Press in US.

Continuing literary activity

Though the term "Beat" is most accurately applied to Ginsberg and his closest friends (Corso, Orlovsky, Kerouac, Burroughs, etc.), the term "Beat Generation" has become associated with many of the other poets Ginsberg met and became friends with in the late 1950s and early 1960s. A key feature of this term seems to be a friendship with Ginsberg. Friendship with Kerouac or Burroughs might also apply, but both writers later strove to disassociate themselves from the name "Beat Generation." Part of their dissatisfaction with the term came from the mistaken identification of Ginsberg as the leader. Ginsberg never claimed to be the leader of a movement. He claimed that many of the writers with whom he had become friends in this period shared many of the same intentions and themes. Some of these friends include: David Amram, Bob Kaufman; Diane di Prima; Jim Cohn; poets associated with the Black Mountain College such as Charles Olson, Robert Creeley, and Denise Levertov; poets associated with the New York School such as Frank O'Hara and Kenneth Koch. LeRoi Jones before he became Amiri Baraka, who, after reading "Howl", wrote a letter to Ginsberg on a sheet of toilet paper. Baraka's independent publishing house Totem Press published Ginsberg's early work. Through a party organized by Baraka, Ginsberg was introduced to Langston Hughes while Ornette Coleman played saxophone.

Later in his life, Ginsberg formed a bridge between the beat movement of the 1950s and the hippies of the 1960s, befriending, among others, Timothy Leary, Ken Kesey, Hunter S. Thompson, and Bob Dylan. Ginsberg gave his last public reading at Booksmith, a bookstore in the Haight-Ashbury neighborhood of San Francisco, a few months before his death. In 1993, Ginsberg visited the University of Maine at Orono to pay homage to the 90-year-old great Carl Rakosi.

Buddhism and Krishna

In 1950, Kerouac began studying Buddhism and shared what he learned from Dwight Goddard's Buddhist Bible with Ginsberg. Ginsberg first heard about the Four Noble Truths and such sutras as the Diamond Sutra at this time.

Ginsberg's spiritual journey began early on with his spontaneous visions, and continued with an early trip to India with Gary Snyder. Snyder had previously spent time in Kyoto to study at the First Zen Institute at Daitoku-ji Monastery. At one point, Snyder chanted the Prajnaparamita, which in Ginsberg's words "blew my mind." His interest piqued, Ginsberg traveled to meet the Dalai Lama as well as the Karmapa at Rumtek Monastery. Continuing on his journey, Ginsberg met Dudjom Rinpoche in Kalimpong, who taught him: "If you see something horrible, don't cling to it, and if you see something beautiful, don't cling to it."

After returning to the United States, a chance encounter on a New York City street with Chögyam Trungpa Rinpoche (they both tried to catch the same cab), a Kagyu and Nyingma Tibetan Buddhist master, led to Trungpa becoming his friend and lifelong teacher. Ginsberg helped Trungpa and New York poet Anne Waldman in founding the Jack Kerouac School of Disembodied Poetics at Naropa University in Boulder, Colorado.

Ginsberg was also involved with Krishnaism. He had started incorporating chanting the Hare Krishna mantra into his religious practice in the mid-1960s. After learning that A. C. Bhaktivedanta Swami Prabhupada, the founder of the Hare Krishna movement in the Western world had rented a store front in New York, he befriended him, visiting him often and suggesting publishers for his books, and a fruitful relationship began. This relationship is documented by Satsvarupa dasa Goswami in his biographical account Srila Prabhupada Lilamrta. Ginsberg donated money, materials, and his reputation to help the Swami establish the first temple, and toured with him to promote his cause.

Despite disagreeing with many of Bhaktivedanta Swami's required prohibitions, Ginsberg often sang the Hare Krishna mantra publicly as part of his philosophy and declared that it brought a state of ecstasy. He was glad that Bhaktivedanta Swami, an authentic swami from India, was now trying to spread the chanting in America. Along with other counterculture ideologists like Timothy Leary, Gary Snyder, and Alan Watts, Ginsberg hoped to incorporate Bhaktivedanta Swami and his chanting into the hippie movement, and agreed to take part in the Mantra-Rock Dance concert and to introduce the swami to the Haight-Ashbury hippie community.

On January 17, 1967, Ginsberg helped plan and organize a reception for Bhaktivedanta Swami at San Francisco International Airport, where fifty to a hundred hippies greeted the Swami, chanting Hare Krishna in the airport lounge with flowers in hands. To further support and promote Bhaktivendata Swami's message and chanting in San Francisco, Allen Ginsberg agreed to attend the Mantra-Rock Dance, a musical event 1967 held at the Avalon Ballroom by the San Francisco Hare Krishna temple. It featured some leading rock bands of the time: Big Brother and the Holding Company with Janis Joplin, the Grateful Dead, and Moby Grape, who performed there along with the Hare Krishna founder Bhaktivedanta Swami and donated proceeds to the Krishna temple. Ginsberg introduced Bhaktivedanta Swami to some three thousand hippies in the audience and led the chanting of the Hare Krishna mantra.

Music and chanting were both important parts of Ginsberg's live delivery during poetry readings. He often accompanied himself on a harmonium, and was often accompanied by a guitarist. It is believed that the Hindi and Buddhist poet Nagarjun had introduced Ginsberg to the harmonium in Banaras. According to Malay Roy Choudhury, Ginsberg refined his practice while learning from his relatives, including his cousin Savitri Banerjee. When Ginsberg asked if he could sing a song in praise of Lord Krishna on William F. Buckley, Jr.'s TV show Firing Line on September 3, 1968, Buckley acceded and the poet chanted slowly as he played dolefully on a harmonium. According to Richard Brookhiser, an associate of Buckley's, the host commented that it was "the most unharried Krishna I've ever heard."

At the 1967 Human Be-In in San Francisco's Golden Gate Park, the 1968 Democratic National Convention in Chicago, and the 1970 Black Panther rally at Yale campus Allen chanted "Om" repeatedly over a sound system for hours on end.

Ginsberg further brought mantras into the world of rock and roll when he recited the Heart Sutra in the song "Ghetto Defendant." The song appears on the 1982 album Combat Rock by British first wave punk band The Clash.

Ginsberg came in touch with the Hungryalist poets of Bengal, especially Malay Roy Choudhury, who introduced Ginsberg to the three fish with one head of Indian emperor Jalaluddin Mohammad Akbar. The three fish symbolised coexistence of all thought, philosophy, and religion.

In spite of Ginsberg's attraction to Eastern religions, the journalist Jane Kramer argues that he, like Whitman, adhered to an "American brand of mysticism" that was "rooted in humanism and in a romantic and visionary ideal of harmony among men."

The Allen Ginsberg Estate and Jewel Heart International partnered to present "Transforming Minds: Kyabje Gelek Rimpoche and Friends," a gallery and online exhibition of images of Gelek Rimpoche by Allen Ginsberg, a student with whom he had an “indissoluble bond,” in 2021 at Tibet House US in New York City. Fifty negatives from Ginsberg's Stanford University photo archive celebrated "the unique relationship between Allen and Rimpoche." The selection of never-before presented images, featuring great Tibetan masters including the Dalai Lama, Tibetologists, and students were "guided by Allen’s extensive notes on the contact sheets and images he’d circled with the intention to print."

Illness and death
In 1960, he was treated for a tropical disease, and it is speculated that he contracted hepatitis from an unsterilized needle administered by a doctor, which played a role in his death 37 years later.
Ginsberg was a lifelong smoker, and though he tried to quit for health and religious reasons, his busy schedule in later life made it difficult, and he always returned to smoking.

In the 1970s, Ginsberg had two minor strokes which were first diagnosed as Bell's palsy, which gave him significant paralysis and stroke-like drooping of the muscles in one side of his face.

Later in life, he also had constant minor ailments such as high blood pressure. Many of these symptoms were related to stress, but he never slowed down his schedule.

Ginsberg won a 1974 National Book Award for The Fall of America (split with Adrienne Rich, Diving into the Wreck).

In 1986, Ginsberg was awarded the Golden Wreath by the Struga Poetry Evenings International Festival in Macedonia, the second American poet to be so awarded since W. H. Auden. At Struga, Ginsberg met with the other Golden Wreath winners, Bulat Okudzhava and Andrei Voznesensky.

In 1989, Ginsberg appeared in Rosa von Praunheim's award-winning film Silence = Death about the fight of gay artists in New York City for AIDS-education and the rights of HIV infected people.

In 1993, the French Minister of Culture appointed Ginsberg a Chevalier des Arts et des Lettres.

Ginsberg continued to help his friends as much as he could: he gave money to Herbert Huncke out of his own pocket, regularly supplied neighbor Arthur Russell with an extension cord to power his home recording setup, and housed a broke, drug-addicted Harry Smith.

With the exception of a special guest appearance at the NYU Poetry Slam on February 20, 1997, Ginsberg gave what is thought to be his last reading at The Booksmith in San Francisco on December 16, 1996.

After returning home from the hospital for the last time, where he had been unsuccessfully treated for congestive heart failure, Ginsberg continued making phone calls to say goodbye to nearly everyone in his address book. Some of the phone calls were sad and interrupted by crying, and others were joyous and optimistic. Ginsberg continued to write through his final illness, with his last poem, "Things I'll Not Do (Nostalgias)", written on March 30.

He died on April 5, 1997, surrounded by family and friends in his East Village loft in Manhattan, succumbing to liver cancer via complications of hepatitis at the age of 70. Gregory Corso, Roy Lichtenstein, Patti Smith and others came by to pay their respects. He was cremated, and his ashes were buried in his family plot in Gomel Chesed Cemetery in Newark. He was survived by Orlovsky.

In 1998, various writers, including Catfish McDaris read at a gathering at Ginsberg's farm to honor Allen and the Beats.

Good Will Hunting (released in December 1997) was dedicated to Ginsberg, as well as Burroughs, who died four months later.

Social and political activism

Free speech
Ginsberg's willingness to talk about taboo subjects made him a controversial figure during the conservative 1950s, and a significant figure in the 1960s. In the mid-1950s, no reputable publishing company would even consider publishing Howl. At the time, such "sex talk" employed in Howl was considered by some to be vulgar or even a form of pornography, and could be prosecuted under law. Ginsberg used phrases such as "cocksucker", "fucked in the ass", and "cunt" as part of the poem's depiction of different aspects of American culture. Numerous books that discussed sex were banned at the time, including Lady Chatterley's Lover. The sex that Ginsberg described did not portray the sex between heterosexual married couples, or even longtime lovers. Instead, Ginsberg portrayed casual sex. For example, in Howl, Ginsberg praises the man "who sweetened the snatches of a million girls." Ginsberg used gritty descriptions and explicit sexual language, pointing out the man "who lounged hungry and lonesome through Houston seeking jazz or sex or soup." In his poetry, Ginsberg also discussed the then-taboo topic of homosexuality. The explicit sexual language that filled Howl eventually led to an important trial on First Amendment issues. Ginsberg's publisher was brought up on charges for publishing pornography, and the outcome led to a judge going on record dismissing charges, because the poem carried "redeeming social importance," thus setting an important legal precedent. Ginsberg continued to broach controversial subjects throughout the 1970s, 1980s, and 1990s. From 1970 to 1996, Ginsberg had a long-term affiliation with PEN American Center with efforts to defend free expression. When explaining how he approached controversial topics, he often pointed to Herbert Huncke: he said that when he first got to know Huncke in the 1940s, Ginsberg saw that he was sick from his heroin addiction, but at the time heroin was a taboo subject and Huncke was left with nowhere to go for help.

Role in Vietnam War protests

Ginsberg was a signer of the anti-war manifesto "A Call to Resist Illegitimate Authority", circulated among draft resistors in 1967 by members of the radical intellectual collective RESIST. Other signers and RESIST members included Mitchell Goodman, Henry Braun, Denise Levertov, Noam Chomsky, William Sloane Coffin, Dwight Macdonald, Robert Lowell, and Norman Mailer. In 1968, Ginsberg signed the "Writers and Editors War Tax Protest" pledge, vowing to refuse tax payments in protest against the Vietnam War, and later became a sponsor of the War Tax Resistance project, which practiced and advocated tax resistance as a form of anti-war protest.

He was present the night of the Tompkins Square Park riot (1988) and provided an eyewitness account to The New York Times.

Relationship to communism
Ginsberg talked openly about his connections with communism and his admiration for past communist heroes and the labor movement at a time when the Red Scare and McCarthyism were still raging. He admired Fidel Castro and many other Marxist figures from the 20th century. In "America" (1956), Ginsberg writes: "America, I used to be a communist when I was a kid I'm not sorry". Biographer Jonah Raskin has claimed that, despite his often stark opposition to communist orthodoxy, Ginsberg held "his own idiosyncratic version of communism." On the other hand, when Donald Manes, a New York City politician, publicly accused Ginsberg of being a member of the Communist Party, Ginsberg objected: "I am not, as a matter of fact, a member of the Communist party, nor am I dedicated to the overthrow of the U.S. government or any government by violence ... I must say that I see little difference between the armed and violent governments both Communist and Capitalist that I have observed".

Ginsberg travelled to several communist countries to promote free speech. He claimed that communist countries, such as China, welcomed him because they thought he was an enemy of capitalism, but often turned against him when they saw him as a troublemaker. For example, in 1965 Ginsberg was deported from Cuba for publicly protesting the persecution of homosexuals. The Cubans sent him to Czechoslovakia, where one week after being named the Král majálesu ("King of May", a students' festivity, celebrating spring and student life), Ginsberg was arrested for alleged drug use and public drunkenness, and the security agency StB confiscated several of his writings, which they considered to be lewd and morally dangerous. Ginsberg was then deported from Czechoslovakia on May 7, 1965, by order of the StB. Václav Havel points to Ginsberg as an important inspiration.

Gay rights
One contribution that is often considered his most significant and most controversial was his openness about homosexuality. Ginsberg was an early proponent of freedom for gay people. In 1943, he discovered within himself "mountains of homosexuality." He expressed this desire openly and graphically in his poetry. He also struck a note for gay marriage by listing Peter Orlovsky, his lifelong companion, as his spouse in his Who's Who entry. Subsequent gay writers saw his frank talk about homosexuality as an opening to speak more openly and honestly about something often before only hinted at or spoken of in metaphor.

In writing about sexuality in graphic detail and in his frequent use of language seen as indecent, he challenged—and ultimately changed—obscenity laws. He was a staunch supporter of others whose expression challenged obscenity laws (William S. Burroughs and Lenny Bruce, for example).

Association with NAMBLA
Ginsberg was a supporter and member of the North American Man/Boy Love Association (NAMBLA), a pedophilia and pederasty advocacy organization in the United States that works to abolish age of consent laws and legalize sexual relations between adults and children. Saying that he joined the organization "in defense of free speech", Ginsberg stated: "Attacks on NAMBLA stink of politics, witchhunting for profit, humorlessness, vanity, anger and ignorance ... I'm a member of NAMBLA because I love boys too—everybody does, who has a little humanity". In 1994, Ginsberg appeared in a documentary on NAMBLA called Chicken Hawk: Men Who Love Boys (playing on the gay male slang term "Chickenhawk"), in which he read a "graphic ode to youth".

In her 2002 book Heartbreak, Andrea Dworkin claimed Ginsberg had ulterior motives for allying with NAMBLA. In reference to his onetime friend Dworkin, Ginsberg stated:

Demystification of drugs

Ginsberg talked often about drug use. He organized the New York City chapter of LeMar (Legalize Marijuana). Throughout the 1960s he took an active role in the demystification of LSD, and, with Timothy Leary, worked to promote its common use. He remained for many decades an advocate of marijuana legalization, and, at the same time, warned his audiences against the hazards of tobacco in his Put Down Your Cigarette Rag (Don't Smoke): "Don't Smoke Don't Smoke Nicotine Nicotine No / No don't smoke the official Dope Smoke Dope Dope."

CIA drug trafficking

Ginsberg worked closely with Alfred W. McCoy on the latter's book The Politics of Heroin in Southeast Asia, which claimed that the CIA was knowingly involved in the production of heroin in the Golden Triangle of Burma, Thailand, and Laos. In addition to working with McCoy, Ginsberg personally confronted Richard Helms, the director of the CIA in the 1970s, about the matter, but Helms denied that the CIA had anything to do with selling illegal drugs. Allen wrote many essays and articles, researching and compiling evidence of the CIA's alleged involvement in drug trafficking, but it took ten years, and the publication of McCoy's book in 1972, before anyone took him seriously. In 1978, Ginsberg received a note from the chief editor of The New York Times, apologizing for not having taken his allegations seriously. The political subject is dealt with in his song/poem "CIA Dope calypso".  The United States Department of State responded to McCoy's initial allegations stating that they were "unable to find any evidence to substantiate them, much less proof."  Subsequent investigations by the Inspector General of the CIA, United States House Committee on Foreign Affairs, and United States Senate Select Committee to Study Governmental Operations with Respect to Intelligence Activities, a.k.a. the Church Committee, also found the charges to be unsubstantiated.

Work
Most of Ginsberg's very early poetry was written in formal rhyme and meter like that of his father, and of his idol William Blake. His admiration for the writing of Jack Kerouac inspired him to take poetry more seriously. In 1955, upon the advice of a psychiatrist, Ginsberg dropped out of the working world to devote his entire life to poetry. Soon after, he wrote Howl, the poem that brought him and his Beat Generation contemporaries to national attention and allowed him to live as a professional poet for the rest of his life. Later in life, Ginsberg entered academia, teaching poetry as Distinguished Professor of English at Brooklyn College from 1986 until his death.

Inspiration from friends
Ginsberg claimed throughout his life that his biggest inspiration was Kerouac's concept of "spontaneous prose." He believed literature should come from the soul without conscious restrictions. Ginsberg was much more prone to revise than Kerouac. For example, when Kerouac saw the first draft of Howl, he disliked the fact that Ginsberg had made editorial changes in pencil (transposing "negro" and "angry" in the first line, for example). Kerouac only wrote out his concepts of spontaneous prose at Ginsberg's insistence because Ginsberg wanted to learn how to apply the technique to his poetry.

The inspiration for Howl was Ginsberg's friend, Carl Solomon, and Howl is dedicated to him. Solomon was a Dada and Surrealism enthusiast (he introduced Ginsberg to Artaud) who had bouts of clinical depression. Solomon wanted to commit suicide, but he thought a form of suicide appropriate to dadaism would be to go to a mental institution and demand a lobotomy. The institution refused, giving him many forms of therapy, including electroshock therapy. Much of the final section of the first part of Howl is a description of this.

Ginsberg used Solomon as an example of all those ground down by the machine of "Moloch." Moloch, to whom the second section is addressed, is a Levantine god to whom children were sacrificed. Ginsberg may have gotten the name from the Kenneth Rexroth poem "Thou Shalt Not Kill," a poem about the death of one of Ginsberg's heroes, Dylan Thomas. Moloch is mentioned a few times in the Torah and references to Ginsberg's Jewish background are frequent in his work. Ginsberg said the image of Moloch was inspired by peyote visions he had of the Francis Drake Hotel in San Francisco which appeared to him as a skull; he took it as a symbol of the city (not specifically San Francisco, but all cities). Ginsberg later acknowledged in various publications and interviews that behind the visions of the Francis Drake Hotel were memories of the Moloch of Fritz Lang's film Metropolis (1927) and of the woodcut novels of Lynd Ward.  Moloch has subsequently been interpreted as any system of control, including the conformist society of post-World War II America, focused on material gain, which Ginsberg frequently blamed for the destruction of all those outside of societal norms.

He also made sure to emphasize that Moloch is a part of humanity in multiple aspects, in that the decision to defy socially created systems of control—and therefore go against Moloch—is a form of self-destruction. Many of the characters Ginsberg references in Howl, such as Neal Cassady and Herbert Huncke, destroyed themselves through excessive substance abuse or a generally wild lifestyle. The personal aspects of Howl are perhaps as important as the political aspects. Carl Solomon, the prime example of a "best mind" destroyed by defying society, is associated with Ginsberg's schizophrenic mother: the line "with mother finally fucked" comes after a long section about Carl Solomon, and in Part III, Ginsberg says: "I'm with you in Rockland where you imitate the shade of my mother." Ginsberg later admitted that the drive to write Howl was fueled by sympathy for his ailing mother, an issue which he was not yet ready to deal with directly. He dealt with it directly with 1959's Kaddish, which had its first public reading at a Catholic Worker Friday Night meeting, possibly due to its associations with Thomas Merton.

Inspiration from mentors and idols
Ginsberg's poetry was strongly influenced by Modernism (most importantly the American style of Modernism pioneered by William Carlos Williams), Romanticism (specifically William Blake and John Keats), the beat and cadence of jazz (specifically that of bop musicians such as Charlie Parker), and his Kagyu Buddhist practice and Jewish background. He considered himself to have inherited the visionary poetic mantle handed down from the English poet and artist William Blake, the American poet Walt Whitman and the Spanish poet Federico García Lorca. The power of Ginsberg's verse, its searching, probing focus, its long and lilting lines, as well as its New World exuberance, all echo the continuity of inspiration that he claimed.

He corresponded with William Carlos Williams, who was then in the middle of writing his epic poem Paterson about the industrial city near his home. After attending a reading by Williams, Ginsberg sent the older poet several of his poems and wrote an introductory letter. Most of these early poems were rhymed and metered and included archaic pronouns like "thee." Williams disliked the poems and told Ginsberg, "In this mode perfection is basic, and these poems are not perfect."

Though he disliked these early poems, Williams loved the exuberance in Ginsberg's letter. He included the letter in a later part of Paterson. He encouraged Ginsberg not to emulate the old masters, but to speak with his own voice and the voice of the common American. From Williams, Ginsberg learned to focus on strong visual images, in line with Williams' own motto "No ideas but in things." Studying Williams' style led to a tremendous shift from the early formalist work to a loose, colloquial free verse style. Early breakthrough poems include Bricklayer's Lunch Hour and Dream Record.

Carl Solomon introduced Ginsberg to the work of Antonin Artaud (To Have Done with the Judgement of God and Van Gogh: The Man Suicided by Society), and Jean Genet (Our Lady of the Flowers). Philip Lamantia introduced him to other Surrealists and Surrealism continued to be an influence (for example, sections of "Kaddish" were inspired by André Breton's Free Union). Ginsberg claimed that the anaphoric repetition of Howl and other poems was inspired by Christopher Smart in such poems as Jubilate Agno. Ginsberg also claimed other more traditional influences, such as: Franz Kafka, Herman Melville, Fyodor Dostoevsky, Edgar Allan Poe, and Emily Dickinson.

Ginsberg also made an intense study of haiku and the paintings of Paul Cézanne, from which he adapted a concept important to his work, which he called the Eyeball Kick. He noticed in viewing Cézanne's paintings that when the eye moved from one color to a contrasting color, the eye would spasm, or "kick." Likewise, he discovered that the contrast of two seeming opposites was a common feature in haiku. Ginsberg used this technique in his poetry, putting together two starkly dissimilar images: something weak with something strong, an artifact of high culture with an artifact of low culture, something holy with something unholy. The example Ginsberg most often used was "hydrogen jukebox" (which later became the title of a song cycle composed by Philip Glass with lyrics drawn from Ginsberg's poems). Another example is Ginsberg's observation on Bob Dylan during Dylan's hectic and intense 1966 electric-guitar tour, fueled by a cocktail of amphetamines, opiates, alcohol, and psychedelics, as a Dexedrine Clown. The phrases "eyeball kick" and "hydrogen jukebox" both show up in Howl, as well as a direct quote from Cézanne: "Pater Omnipotens Aeterna Deus".

Inspiration from music

Allen Ginsberg also found inspiration in music. He frequently included music in his poetry, invariably composing his tunes on an old Indian harmonium, which he often played during his readings. He wrote and recorded music to accompany William Blake's Songs of Innocence and Songs of Experience. He also recorded a handful of other albums. To create music for Howl and Wichita Vortex Sutra, he worked with the minimalist composer, Philip Glass.

Ginsberg worked with, drew inspiration from, and inspired artists such as Bob Dylan, The Clash, Patti Smith, Phil Ochs, and The Fugs. He worked with Dylan on various projects and maintained a friendship with him over many years.

In 1981, Ginsberg recorded a song called "Birdbrain." He was backed by the Gluons, and the track was released as a single. In 1996, he recorded a song co-written with Paul McCartney and Philip Glass, "The Ballad of the Skeletons," which reached number 8 on the Triple J Hottest 100 for that year.

Style and technique
From the study of his idols and mentors and the inspiration of his friends—not to mention his own experiments—Ginsberg developed an individualistic style that's easily identified as Ginsbergian. Ginsberg stated that Whitman's long line was a dynamic technique few other poets had ventured to develop further, and Whitman is also often compared to Ginsberg because their poetry sexualized aspects of the male form.

Many of Ginsberg's early long line experiments contain some sort of anaphora, repetition of a "fixed base" (for example "who" in Howl, "America" in America) and this has become a recognizable feature of Ginsberg's style. He said later this was a crutch because he lacked confidence; he did not yet trust "free flight." In the 1960s, after employing it in some sections of Kaddish ("caw" for example) he, for the most part, abandoned the anaphoric form.

Several of his earlier experiments with methods for formatting poems as a whole became regular aspects of his style in later poems. In the original draft of Howl, each line is in a "stepped triadic" format reminiscent of William Carlos Williams. He abandoned the "stepped triadic" when he developed his long line although the stepped lines showed up later, most significantly in the travelogues of The Fall of America. Howl and Kaddish, arguably his two most important poems, are both organized as an inverted pyramid, with larger sections leading to smaller sections. In America, he also experimented with a mix of longer and shorter lines.

Ginsberg's mature style made use of many specific, highly developed techniques, which he expressed in the "poetic slogans" he used in his Naropa teaching. Prominent among these was the inclusion of his unedited mental associations so as to reveal the mind at work ("First thought, best thought." "Mind is shapely, thought is shapely.") He preferred expression through carefully observed physical details rather than abstract statements ("Show, don't tell." "No ideas but in things.") In these he carried on and developed traditions of modernism in writing that are also found in Kerouac and Whitman.

In Howl and in his other poetry, Ginsberg drew inspiration from the epic, free verse style of the 19th-century American poet Walt Whitman. Both wrote passionately about the promise (and betrayal) of American democracy, the central importance of erotic experience, and the spiritual quest for the truth of everyday existence. J. D. McClatchy, editor of the Yale Review, called Ginsberg "the best-known American poet of his generation, as much a social force as a literary phenomenon." McClatchy added that Ginsberg, like Whitman, "was a bard in the old manner—outsized, darkly prophetic, part exuberance, part prayer, part rant. His work is finally a history of our era's psyche, with all its contradictory urges." McClatchy's barbed eulogies define the essential difference between Ginsberg ("a beat poet whose writing was [...] journalism raised by combining the recycling genius with a generous mimic-empathy, to strike audience-accessible chords; always lyrical and sometimes truly poetic") and Kerouac ("a poet of singular brilliance, the brightest luminary of a 'beat generation' he came to symbolise in popular culture [...] [though] in reality he far surpassed his contemporaries [...] Kerouac is an originating genius, exploring then answering—like Rimbaud a century earlier, by necessity more than by choice—the demands of authentic self-expression as applied to the evolving quicksilver mind of America's only literary virtuoso [...]").

Bibliography
 Howl and Other Poems (1956), 
 Kaddish and Other Poems (1961), 
 Empty Mirror: Early Poems (1961), 
 Reality Sandwiches (1963), 
 The Yage Letters (1963)with William S. Burroughs
 Planet News (1968), 
 Indian Journals (1970), 
 First Blues: Rags, Ballads & Harmonium Songs 1971 - 1974 (1975), 
 The Gates of Wrath: Rhymed Poems 1948–1951 (1972), 
 The Fall of America: Poems of These States (1973), 
 Iron Horse (1973)
 Allen Verbatim: Lectures on Poetry, Politics, Consciousness by Allen Ginsberg (1974), edited by Gordon Ball, 
 Sad Dust Glories: poems during work summer in woods (1975)
 Mind Breaths (1978), 
 Plutonian Ode: Poems 1977–1980 (1981), 
 Collected Poems 1947–1980 (1984), . Republished with later material added as Collected Poems 1947-1997, New York, HarperCollins, 2006
 White Shroud Poems: 1980–1985 (1986), 
 Cosmopolitan Greetings Poems: 1986–1993 (1994)
 Howl Annotated (1995)
 Illuminated Poems (1996)
 Selected Poems: 1947–1995 (1996)
 Death and Fame: Poems 1993–1997 (1999)
 Deliberate Prose 1952–1995 (2000)
 Howl & Other Poems 50th Anniversary Edition (2006), 
 The Book of Martyrdom and Artifice: First Journals and Poems 1937-1952 (Da Capo Press, 2006)
 The Selected Letters of Allen Ginsberg and Gary Snyder (Counterpoint, 2009)
 I Greet You at the Beginning of a Great Career: The Selected Correspondence of Lawrence Ferlinghetti and Allen Ginsberg, 1955–1997 (City Lights, 2015)
 The Best Minds of My Generation: A Literary History of the Beats (Grove Press, 2017)

Honors
His collection The Fall of America shared the annual U.S. National Book Award for Poetry in 1974. In 1979, he received the National Arts Club gold medal and was inducted into the American Academy and Institute of Arts and Letters. Ginsberg was a Pulitzer Prize finalist in 1995 for his book Cosmopolitan Greetings: Poems 1986–1992. In 1993, he received a John Jay Award posthumously from Columbia.

In 2014, Ginsberg was one of the inaugural honorees in the Rainbow Honor Walk, a walk of fame in San Francisco's Castro neighborhood noting LGBTQ people who have "made significant contributions in their fields."

See also

 The Life and Times of Allen Ginsberg (film)
 :Category:Works by Allen Ginsberg
 Allen Ginsberg Live in London
 Hungry generation
 Howl (2010 film)
 LGBT culture in New York City
 List of LGBT people from New York City
 Central Park Be-In
 Trevor Carolan
 Counterculture of the 1960s
 Burroughs: the Movie by Howard Brookner
 List of peace activists
 Kill Your Darlings
 Jewish Buddhist
 American poetry

Notes

References

Resources
 The Allen Ginsberg Papers, 1937–1994 (1,330 linear ft.) are housed in the Department of Special Collections and University Archives at Stanford University Libraries

Further reading
 Boer, Charles. Charles Olson in Connecticut. North Carolina Wesleyan College Press, 1991, (1975). .
 Bullough, Vern L. "Before Stonewall: Activists for Gay and Lesbian Rights in Historical Context." Harrington Park Press, 2002. pp 304–311.
 Charters, Ann (ed.). The Portable Beat Reader. Penguin Books. New York. 1992.  (hc);  (pbk)
 Clark, Thomas. "Allen Ginsberg." Writers at WorkThe Paris Review Interviews. 3.1 (1968) pp. 279–320.
 Collins, Ronald & Skover, David. Mania: The Story of the Outraged & Outrageous Lives that Launched a Cultural Revolution (Top-Five books, March 2013)
 Gifford, Barry (ed.). As Ever: The Collected Letters of Allen Ginsberg & Neal Cassady. Berkeley: Creative Arts Books (1977).
 Ginsberg, Allen. Travels with Ginsberg: A Postcard Book. San Francisco: City Lights (2002). 
 Hrebeniak, Michael. Action Writing: Jack Kerouac's Wild Form, Carbondale, IL: Southern Illinois UP, 2006.
 Kashner, Sam, When I Was Cool, My Life at the Jack Kerouac School, New York: HarperCollins Perennial, 2005. 
 Podhoretz, Norman. "At War with Allen Ginsberg", in Ex-Friends (Free Press, 1999), 22–56. .
 McBride, Dick: Cometh With Clouds (Memory: Allen Ginsberg) Cherry Valley Editions, 1982 
 
 
 Morgan, Bill (ed.), I Greet You at the Beginning of a Great Career: The Selected Correspondence of Lawrence Ferlinghetti and Allen Ginsberg, 1955–1997. San Francisco: City Lights Publishers, 2015.
 
 
 
 
 
 
 
 
 
 
 
 
 
 
 Schumacher, Michael (ed.). Family Business: Selected Letters Between a Father and Son. Bloomsbury (2002), paperback, 448 pages, 
 Schumacher, Michael. Dharma Lion: A Biography of Allen Ginsberg. New York: St. Martin's Press, 1994.
 Trigilio, Tony. Allen Ginsberg's Buddhist Poetics. Carbondale, IL: Southern Illinois University Press, 2007. 
 Trigilio, Tony. "Strange Prophecies Anew": Rereading Apocalypse in Blake, H.D., and Ginsberg. Madison, NJ: Fairleigh Dickinson University Press, 2000. .
 Tytell, John. Naked Angels: Kerouac, Ginsberg, Burroughs. Chicago: Ivan R. Dee, 1976. 
 Warner, Simon (ed.). Howl for Now: A 50th anniversary celebration of Allen Ginsberg's epic protest poem. West Yorkshire, UK: Route (2005), paperback, 144 pages, 
 Warner, Simon. "Raising the Consciousness? Re-visiting Allen Ginsberg's 1965 trip to Liverpool", chapter in Centre of the Creative Universe: Liverpool and the Avant Garde, edited by Christoph Grunenberg and Robert Knifton. Liverpool & Chicago: Liverpool University Press & Chicago University Press, 2007,  (pbk);  (hc)
 Young, Allen Gay Sunshine interview with Allen Ginsberg. Grey Fox Press, 1974. 
 First Thought is Best Thought, an interview with Allen Ginsberg, in Scottish International Volume 6, September 1973, pp. 18–23

External links

Archives 
 George Dowden papers on the Allen Ginsberg bibliography, 1966–1971 at Rare Book and Manuscripts Library, Columbia University Libraries
 Materials related to Allen Ginsberg in the Robert A. Wilson collection at Special Collections, University of Delaware Library
 Allen Ginsberg papers at Special Collections and University Archives, Stanford Libraries

Audio recordings and interviews 
 Audio recordings of Allen Ginsberg, from the Woodberry Poetry Room, Harvard University
 Audio recordings of Allen Ginsberg, from Maryland Institute College of Art's Decker Library, Internet Archive
 Modern American Poetry, interview

Other links 
 The Allen Ginsberg Trust
 
 
 
 Case Histories: Allen Ginsberg at PEN.org honoring Ginsberg's work, from PEN American Center
 Allen Ginsberg on Poets.org With audio clips, poems, and related essays, from the Academy of American Poets
 "After 50 Years, Ginsberg's Howl Still Resonates" NPR October 27, 2006
 Allen Ginsberg photographs with hand-written captions at LensCulture
 Autobiographical Article in Shambhala Sun Magazine 
 FBI agents were warned against interviewing Allen Ginsberg, fearing it would result in "embarrassment" from MuckRock.com
 
 Allen Ginsberg materials in "Beat Visions and the Counterculture" (online exhibition) at Special Collections, University of Delaware Library

1926 births
1997 deaths
20th-century American male writers
20th-century American poets
20th-century Buddhists
Activists from New York (state)
American anti–nuclear weapons activists
American anti–Vietnam War activists
American cannabis activists
American expatriates in France
American LGBT poets
American male poets
American pacifists
American sailors
American social commentators
American spoken word artists
American tax resisters
Beat Generation poets
Brooklyn College faculty
Columbia College (New York) alumni
Converts to Buddhism
Deaths from cancer in New York (state)
Deaths from liver cancer
Eastside High School (Paterson, New Jersey) alumni
English-language haiku poets
Free speech activists
Gay academics
American gay writers
Industrial Workers of the World members
Jewish American poets
LGBT Buddhists
LGBT Jews
LGBT people from Colorado
LGBT people from New Jersey
LGBT people from New York (state)
American LGBT rights activists
Military personnel from New Jersey
Montclair State University alumni
National Book Award winners
Obscenity controversies in literature
Outlaw poets
Pedophile advocacy
Pedophilia in the United States
People from Greenwich Village
People from the East Village, Manhattan
Poets from New Jersey
Postmodern writers
American psychedelic drug advocates
Struga Poetry Evenings Golden Wreath laureates
Tibetan Buddhists from the United States
Transatlantic Records artists
United States Merchant Mariners of World War II
Writers from Boulder, Colorado
Writers from Manhattan
Writers from Newark, New Jersey
Writers from Paterson, New Jersey
Yippies
Locust Music artists
Gay poets